Montgomery Creek may refer to:
 Montgomery Creek, California
 Montgomery Creek (Georgia)
 Montgomery Creek (Boone County, Iowa)
 Montgomery Creek (Wisconsin) is a tributary of the Clam River (Wisconsin)
 Montgomery Creek (Ontario) is a tributary of Oshawa Creek, in Ontario